María Natalia Lafourcade Silva (born 26 February 1984) is a Mexican pop-rock, jazz and folk singer and songwriter who, since her debut in 2002, has been one of the most successful singers in Latin America. Lafourcade's voice has been categorized as a lyric soprano.

Early life

María Natalia Lafourcade Silva was born on 26 February 1984 in Mexico City, Mexico, and grew up in Coatepec, Veracruz, Mexico, surrounded by music and art. Her father is the Chilean musician , who had French parents, and her mother is the pianist María del Carmen Silva Contreras. Her uncle was Chilean writer Enrique Lafourcade, a representative of the so-called "Generation of the 50s".

During her childhood, Lafourcade studied music with her mother, being influenced by artists like Shakira, Ely Guerra and Julieta Venegas imitating artists such as Gloria Trevi and Garibaldi. Her mother studied piano with a specialty in musical pedagogy and is the creator of the Macarsi Method for musical training and personal development for children and educators. She adapted and practiced the method with Lafourcade to help her rehabilitate through music, following a head injury from being kicked by a horse.

She attended Instituto Anglo Español, a Catholic middle school, and studied painting, flute, theater, music, acting, piano, guitar, saxophone, and singing. When she was 10, Lafourcade sang in a Mariachi group.

Career

1998–2000: Early years and Twist 
In 1998, Lafourcade joined a pop music group called Twist. The members included Lafourcade, Tábatha Vizuet (former member of the group Jeans), and Ana Pamela Garcés (former host of a children's television program on TV Azteca). The group was unsuccessful and they split up the following year. Lafourcade has stated that one of the things she disliked about being in Twist, and a reason she began to look for alternatives, was having to lip sync (mime) when performing.

After finishing high school, Lafourcade enrolled at Academia de Música Fermatta, where she met Ximena Sariñana, Juan Manuel Torreblanca, and Alonso Cortés, who would eventually be the drummer for La Forquetina years later.

In 2000, producer Loris Ceroni listened to the demos he had received from Lafourcade and, when she was 17, he gave Lafourcade the opportunity to be in a pop/rock group under his guidance. Lafourcade was hesitant, and Ceroni instead encouraged her to become independent. Lafourcade produced her first LP under the label of Sony Music. She performed in the city of Dolores Hidalgo, in a concert at the Colegio Lic. Álvaro de Osio y Ocampo, granting her recognition across the country.

2002–2004: Debut album and first hits 
In June 2002, Lafourcade released her first album, self-titled Natalia Lafourcade, a mix of pop, rock, bossa-nova and Latin rhythms. The singles on the album were "Busca un Problema", her biggest hit "En el 2000", "Te Quiero Dar", and "Mírame, Mírate". During this time, she was also the principal contributor to the soundtrack for the Mexican movie Amar te duele, recording the main theme "Amarte Duele", the acoustic version of the song, as well as adding three songs from her first album to the soundtrack: "Busca un Problema", "En el 2000", and "El Destino".

In 2003, she was nominated for a Latin Grammy in the Best New Artist category for her debut album, and was nominated for Rock New Artist at the 16th Lo Nuestro Awards, losing to fellow Mexican singer Alessandra Rosaldo.

At the end of the tour for her first album, Natalia Lafourcade stopped performing as a soloist and began to perform with her band—Alonso Cortés, and Yunuén Viveros—as Natalia y la Forquetina.

2005–2007: La Forquetina and Casa 
In 2005, she released Casa, her second album, but this time as Natalia y La Forquetina, the name of her band. Produced mostly by Café Tacuba's , Casa presents a more mature, rock-oriented sound while retaining pop and bossa-nova influences on a few tracks, such as lead single "Ser Humano" (pop-rock) and its follow-up "Casa" (pop-bossa-nova). Áureo Baqueiro returned to produce the few tracks not produced by del Real.

On 2 June of 2006, after a tour through Mexico and parts of the U.S., Lafourcade announced she would leave La Forquetina to once again work as a solo artist. Natalia y la Forquetina's final show was played on 18 August 2006 in San Luis Potosí. Following the group's break-up, Casa won the Latin Grammy for Best Rock Album by a Duo or Group with Vocal in September.

Also in 2006, a documentary about the band, showing the group on the road and their travels, was aired on MTV Tr3s in the fall of 2007.

Natalia Lafourcade has also appeared on other songs with various other artists. These include  "Jardin", Kalimba's "Dia de Suerte", Control Machete's "El Apostador", and Reik's rendition of a Lafourcade song "Amarte Duele". She also reappeared with her former band on various compilation disks with previously unreleased tracks such as "Y Todo Para Que" on Intocable's X, and on the Tin Tan tribute album, Viva Tin Tan, with the hit "Piel Canela". In 2011, she made "Quisiera Saber", a music video with Los Daniels.

2007: Las 4 Estaciones del Amor 
Natalia Lafourcade moved to Canada where she met the band People Project, with whom she still frequently collaborates.

Lafourcade returned to Mexico and began to work on Las 4 Estaciones del Amor, her first instrumental album, in collaboration with the Orquesta Sinfónica Juvenil del Estado de Veracruz (OSJEV). The album, under Sony BMG label, also included a DVD where she narrated the whole process of making an instrumental album. She also wrote the Lyrics for "Tú y Yo" from Ximena Sariñana's self-titled album.

2008–2011: HU HU HU and collaborations 

In 2008, she performed on Julieta Venegas' MTV Unplugged album and DVD, where she played several instruments including the bass. She was also a participant in the Red Bull Music Academy in its 2008 edition, held in Barcelona, Spain. On the same year, she began to record her fourth album, and held a concert at the Teatro Metropólitan with Juan Son, Porter's ex-vocalist.

From 2008, Lafourcade had been planning her next album, which she started on at the beginning of 2009. In May 2009, she released the album HU HU HU, a top 10 album in Mexico. The album was produced by Emmanuel del Real (who produced "Casa" in 2005), Marco Moreno, and Ernesto García. It features internationally-known rock and pop artists, such as Julieta Venegas and Juan Son. The first alternative single that she proposed was the song "Azul", however, the label released the single "Ella es Bonita" simultaneously on the radio and in the press. The album was recommended during the summer of 2009. Lafourcade embarked on various projects. The influence of her stay in Canada and her previous album, Las 4 Estaciones del Amor, is noticeable in this album. In December 2009, HU HU HU had its official presentation at the Teatro Fru Fru, in Mexico City, where it had guests such as Denise Gutiérrez of Hello Seahorse!, Furland, and Carla Morrison. It was nominated for Best female Pop Vocal Album at the 2009 Latin Grammy Awards (won by Laura Pausini) and Best Latin Pop album at the 2010 Grammy Awards (won by La Quinta Estación). Club Fonograma also named the album the second best of 2009, and the seventh best of the decade.

She joined the non-profit project Un Techo para mi País, which aims to promote community development through the construction of temporary housing for low-income people and other social empowerment projects. She voice-acted for the role of the princess in the Spanish version of the computer-animated film The True History of Puss 'N Boots, a French production distributed by MK2 Diffusion.

2010 was the year of collaborations for Natalia. She recorded the song "Contigo" with the Spanish band El Canto del Loco, and the song "Quisiera Saber" with the Mexican group Los Daniels. Together with Manolo García, she performed the duet "Pájaros de Barro" and "Cursis Melodías" for Lunas del Auditorio Nacional in Mexico City. In 2011, Lafourcade won the Best New Producer of the Year award in the Indie-O Music Awards, for her work with Carla Morrison's Mientras Tú Dormías... album, and a Telehit Award.

In the same year, she went on tour again, in Japan, and did so on a more instrumental plane, in which her musical and artistic growth was noted. This is how she made the documentary 14 Días en Japón, which was included in the HU HU HU reissue.

HU HU HU's tour spanned South America, Europe, the United States, Mexico, and Japan, and ended with a successful presentation at the Vive Latino 2011 Festival Iberoamericano de Cultura Musical, thus achieving a reconciliation with this audience after her unfortunate reception at the presentation in 2003.

2012–2014: Mujer Divina 
Her album Mujer Divina – Homenaje a Agustín Lara was released 18 September 2012. For this production, Natalia was accompanied by guest musicians, with whom she reinterprets the classic songs of Lara, to be compiled on a double disc containing a DVD, recorded in the forums of her record company.

Among the guests on this album are Miguel Bosé, Leonardo de Lozanne, Gilberto Gil, the Uruguayan singer-songwriter Jorge Drexler, Café Tacvba's Emmanuel del Real, Lila Downs, the Venezuelan-American musician Devendra Banhart, the group DLD, and Kevin Johansen, the latter who participates in the song "Fugitiva", the production's first single released in digital download. With the song "Azul", featuring Rodrigo Amarante, she contributed to the soundtrack of the Mexican film Güeros.

For this album, Lafourcade obtained, in December 2013, a platinum and gold record for having over 94,000 sales.

2015–2017: Hasta la Raíz 
Her next album, Hasta La Raíz, was released in March 2015. "Nunca Es Suficiente", the first single off the album, was released on 10 February. The track "Hasta La Raíz" was No. 5 of the Viral 50 Global Spotify Chart and No. 1 on the Viral 50 México chart. It is with this album that, in the sixteenth version of the Latin Grammys, it won the awards for "Song of the Year", "Best Alternative Song", and "Record of the Year" for "Hasta la Raíz", and "Best Alternative Music Album" and "Best Engineered Album".

She performed on the NPR Music Tiny Desk series on 27 October 2017. In the first month of its presence on YouTube, it had been viewed more than 1,350,000 times. As of 25 August 2019 that same video had been viewed over 8,671,800 times.

2017–2018: Musas I and II and hiatus 

On 5 May 2017, Natalia Lafourcade presented her new album, Musas, accompanied by Los Macorinos, old-school musicians who previously worked with artists like Chavela Vargas. The album's first single, "Tú Sí Sabes Quererme", reached 22 million streams on Spotify in the first two months of its release. In this album, Lafourcade takes up the trend that began in Hasta la Raíz of paying homage to the authors who have influenced her musical career. The album was certified gold in Mexico for exceeding 30,000 sales.

From 19 to 30 August, she toured Argentina, called the "Tú Sí Sabes Argentina" tour, with overwhelming success: Córdoba, Rosario, Buenos Aires, La Plata, Mar del Plata, and Mendoza were witness scenes of a walk through the music of Mexico and other regions in the Americas. On this occasion, the stages that received her were strongly attended, including two fully-sold presentations at La Trastienda Club and the famous "Ballena Azul" concert hall at the CCK Centro Cultural Néstor Kirchner, which left a large number of fans outside since tickets were sold out in fifteen minutes.

At the end of 2017, Lafourcade participated in the original music for Disney-Pixar's film Coco, playing two versions of the song, "Recuérdame" in Spanish and "Remember Me" in English. For the Mexican and Latin American version, she interpreted a solo version that did not appear in the film, but was included on the album. The final version was that of Carlos Rivera. In the U.S. version, Lafourcade interprets the song together with American musician, Miguel, being the main theme. This version won the Oscar for "Best Original Song".

In February 2018, she released the album Musas Volumen 2, which includes songs she personally composed, such as "Danza de Gardenias", "Hoy Mi Día Uno", and the rerelease of the protest song "Un Derecho de Nacimiento". Also included are songs by great Latin American composers, such as Álvaro Carrillo, Augusto Polo Campos, and María Grever. After the release of Musas Volumen 2, she toured Europe, performing at the KOKO Theater in London, at the Bataclan in Paris, at the Sala Apolo in Barcelona, and in the cities of Madrid and Ferrol. After the European tour, Natalia Lafourcade appeared on the stage of the 90th Academy Awards together with Gael García Bernal and Miguel, due to the nomination of "Remember Me". The song was chosen as the winner. In mid-April 2018, she announced that she would continue with the "Musas Tour", with two concerts at the Teatro Gran Rex in Chile, Canada, and the United States, and finish the tour in Mexico. After this, she announced that she would be taking a break from her musical career.

After concluding the Musas tour, she announced that she would dedicate her time away from the stage to the reconstruction efforts of the Son Jarocho Documentation Center that was damaged after the earthquakes in Mexico in 2017. She occasionally left her break to perform at the Grammys and Latin Grammys' ceremonies.

2019–2021: Un canto por México 
As the first step for new record material, Lafourcade held press conferences from 30 September 2019 to 5 December 2019, and the music video for her single "Una vida" was published on YouTube. Un canto por México is inspired by Luis Miguel's studio album, ¡México por siempre!.

In Lafourcade's words, the album "tastes like mole" and contains melodies from past albums as new versions, such is the case of "Hasta la raíz" in the style of Son Jarocho in the company of Los Cojolites and Los Auténticos Decadentes, other songs included are "Mexicana hermosa" in a mariachi version with Carlos Rivera, "Un derecho de nacimiento", "Ya no vivo por vivir", "Nunca es suficiente", "Lo que construimos", "Mi tierra veracruzana", "Cucurrucucú paloma", among others. The video clip for the single "Mi religión" was released on 7 May 2020, and was recorded on the streets of Guanajuato and San Miguel de Allende. The song focuses on Lafourcade's love of music.

On 28 May 2021, Lafourcade officially released the second part of what turned out to be a two-part series, Un canto por México, vol. 2. The profits were also donated towards the reconstruction of the cultural center of Veracruz.

2022–present: De todas las flores 
After traveling to Hacienda San Lorenzo in  Parras, Coahuila (the oldest winery in Mexico), Lafourcade was inspired to collaborate with poet Citlali Aguilera Lira to produce the single "Tierra querida." The song was released on June 17, 2022.

On October 28, 2022, Lafourcade released her first album in seven years to be composed entirely of original songs, De Todas las Flores. Additionally, she premiered the album at Carnegie Hall on October 27, 2022. The album was produced by  Adán Jodorowsky, with musicians including guitarist  Marc Ribot, bass player  Sebastian Steinberg and drummer Cyril Atef.

Discography

Studio albums

Singles

Awards and nominations

Grammy Awards
The Grammy Award is an accolade by the National Academy of Recording Arts and Sciences of the United States to recognize outstanding achievement on the music industry.
{| class="wikitable plainrowheaders" style="width:75%;"
! scope="col" style="width:4%;"| Year
! scope="col" style="width:50%;"| Category
! scope="col" style="width:35%;"| Nominated work
! scope="col" style="width:6%;"| Result
! scope="col" style="width:6%;"| 
|-
| 2004 || rowspan="2"|Best Latin Pop Album || Natalia Lafourcade ||  || 
|-
| 2010 || Hu Hu Hu ||  || 
|-
| 2016 || Best Latin Rock, Urban or Alternative Album ||  Hasta la Raíz || || 
|-
| 2018 || rowspan="2"|Best Latin Pop Album || Musas Vol. 1 ||  || 
|-
| 2019 || Musas, Vol. 2 ||  || 
|-
| 2021 || rowspan="3"|Best Regional Mexican Music Album (including Tejano) || Un Canto por México, Vol. 1 ||  || 
|-
| 2022 || Un Canto por México, Vol. 2 ||  || 
|-
| 2023 || Un Canto por México - El Musical ||  || style="text-align:center;"|
|-

Latin Grammy Awards
A Latin Grammy Award is an accolade by the Latin Academy of Recording Arts & Sciences to recognize outstanding achievement in the music industry.

Gallery

Notes

References

External links

 

1984 births
Living people
Alternative rock singers
Feminist musicians
Mexican feminists
Mexican women singer-songwriters
Mexican singer-songwriters
 female
Mexican people of French descent
Mexican people of Chilean descent
Singers from Mexico City
Latin Grammy Award winners
Sony Music Latin artists
Rock en Español musicians
Sony Music Mexico artists
Mexican sopranos
Grammy Award winners
21st-century Mexican singers
21st-century Mexican women singers
Women in Latin music
Latin music songwriters